180 Out is an American Christian punk and Christian rock band, and they primarily play punk rock, pop punk, and skate punk. They come from Escondido, California. The band started making music in 2008, and their members are vocalist and guitarist, Joe Dukes, vocalist and drummer, Spencer Dukes, vocalist and bassist, Mike Trunnell. Their first release, Send Down Your Love, an album, was released in 2010, independently. The subsequent release, Black & White, a studio album, was released by Thumper Punk Records, in 2012.

Background
180 Out is a Christian rock and pop punk band from Escondido, California. Their members are vocalist and guitarist, Joe Dukes, vocalist and drummer, Spencer Dukes, vocalist and bassist, Mike Trunnell..

Music history
The band commenced as a musical entity in January 2008, with their first release, Send Down Your Love, an independently-made album, that was released in 2010. Their subsequent release, Black & White, was released by Thumper Punk Records, on October 11, 2012.

Members
Current members
 Joe Dukes - guitar, vocals
 Spencer Dukes - drums, vocals
 Mike Trunnell - bass, vocals

Discography
Studio albums
 Black & White (October 11, 2012, Thumper Punk)
Independent albums
 Send Down Your Love (2012, Independent)

References

Musical groups from California
2008 establishments in California
Musical groups established in 2008